This list of tallest buildings in Bosnia and Herzegovina ranks Bosnia and Herzegovina's buildings that stand at least 

The tallest building in Bosnia and Herzegovina is currently the Avaz Twist Tower in Sarajevo. One of the most popular skyscrapers in Sarajevo are the UNITIC World Trade Towers, they were renovated after the war in the 1990s, but originally were completed in 1981.

List

Tallest under construction
This list contains tallest buildings in Bosnia and Herzegovina which are under construction or approved.

Under construction

Approved

See also
List of tallest buildings in the Balkans
List of tallest buildings in Croatia
List of tallest buildings in North Macedonia
List of tallest structures in Serbia
List of tallest buildings in Slovenia

References

Tallest
Bosnia and Herzegovina
Bosnia and Herzegovina